Colomesus is a genus of pufferfishes confined to tropical South America. Apart from differences in size, the three species are superficially similar, being green above, white below, and patterned with black transverse bands across the dorsal surface.  C. asellus is commonly found in the aquarium trade, while C. psittacus, due to its size and more specialized requirements, is not found as often.

Species
There are currently three recognized species in this genus according to FishBase and the Catalog of Fishes.

 Colomesus asellus (J. P. Müller & Troschel, 1849) (Amazon puffer)
 Colomesus psittacus (Bloch & J. G. Schneider, 1801) (Banded puffer)
 Colomesus tocantinensis Amaral, Brito, Silva & Carvalho, 2013

References

External links
FishBase: C. psittacus
FishBase: C. asellus

Tetraodontidae
Freshwater fish genera
Taxa named by Theodore Gill